Baller's Lady is the debut studio album by the American rapper Passion. It was released on August 27, 1996, through MCA Records. Production was handled by Kirv, Mark C. Henry and Studio Ton. The album features guest appearances from B-Legit, E-40, Rappin' 4-Tay and Too $hort, among others. The album was a commercial failure and only made it to #85 on the Top R&B/Hip-Hop Albums, causing MCA to drop her from the label.

Leading up to the album's release in the summer of 1996, Passion made guest appearances on several high profile albums, including Erick Sermon's Double or Nothing and The D.O.C.'s Helter Skelter. Her debut single "Where I'm From" was released in early 1996 and it became a minor hit on the Billboard Hot Rap Songs charts.

Track listing
"Keep It Real" - 3:25  
"Where I'm From" - 3:26  
"Gigolos Get Lonely Too" - 5:25  
"Baller's Lady" - 3:46 (featuring E-40) 
"Fonky Ride" - 4:54 (featuring B-Legit) 
"Who's the Mack?" - 1:20  
"Feel Me" - 4:47  
"B.I.T.C.H." - 1:36  
"Gotta Be da Bomb" - 3:23 (featuring D.A.P.)
"Sho Luv Them Gangstas "- 4:12  
"Playa Hatas" - 3:48 (featuring Tee)
"Can't Be #1" - 3:33  
"Natural High" - 4:29 (featuring D.A.P.)
"Bump Fo Ya Trunk "- 1:30  
"Don't Fight the Remix" - 4:12 (featuring Too $hort, Rappin' 4-Tay & Soul Depot)

Chart history

References

External links

1996 debut albums
MCA Records albums
Passion (rapper) albums
Albums produced by Studio Ton